Anna S. Kashina, Ph.D. is a faculty member at the University of Pennsylvania School of Veterinary Medicine, as well as a writer. Originally from Moscow, Russia, she graduated from Moscow State University, and moved to the  United States in 1994 and has been living there ever since.

She published her first fantasy novel, The Princess of Dhagabad, which is the first of “The Spirits of the Ancient Sands” trilogy, in 2000. The book is about a romance between an Arabian princess and her djinn who in turn becomes her slave, teacher and steadfast companion. Kashina has published two other books in Russia, one under the pen name Ann Porridge. The Princess of Dhagabad was her first English-language publication.

English-language novels
 The Princess of Dhagabad, The Spirits of the Ancient Sands: BOOK ONE (2000)
The Goddess of Dance, The Spirits of the Ancient Sands: BOOK TWO (2012)
Mistress of the Solstice (A fantasy novel set in the world of Russian myth) (2013)
Blades of the Old Empire, The Majat Code, BOOK ONE (2014)
The Guild of Assassins, The Majat Code, BOOK TWO (2014) (double Prism Award winner 2015)
Assassin Queen, The Majat Code, BOOK THREE (2016)
Shadowblade (2019)

Foreign language novels
 Mistress of the Solstice (Die Sonnwendherrin) (In German, Deutscher Taschenbuch Verlag, 2008) 
 The First Sword (Das Erste Schwert) (In German, Deutscher Taschenbuch Verlag, 2008)
 In the Name of the Queen (In Russian, Moscow, NK, 1996)

Upcoming novels
  Lacrimosa of Dana: The Official Novelization (2023)

External links
 Anna Kashina's Personal Webpage 
 Anna Kashina's Professional Website
 Science Online Seminar presented by Anna Kashina
 

Russian women novelists
Russian women short story writers
Russian journalists
Russian veterinarians
Living people
Year of birth missing (living people)
Russian emigrants to the United States
University of Pennsylvania faculty